The Asset Management Association of China (“AMAC”) is a self-regulatory association of fund management companies in China.

References

External links

Trade associations based in China
Organizations established in 2012
2012 establishments in China